The San Diego State Aztecs women's golf team represents San Diego State University in collegiate golf. The Aztecs compete in the Mountain West Conference (MW) in Division I of the National Collegiate Athletic Association (NCAA). The team has been coached by former LPGA Tour golfer Leslie Spalding since the 2011–12 season.

See also 

 Aztec Hall of Fame

References

External links 

 

women's
Mountain West Conference women's golf